{{DISPLAYTITLE:C40H56O2}}
The molecular formula C40H56O2 (molar mass: 568.87 g/mol) may refer to:

 Lutein
 Zeaxanthin
 Meso-zeaxanthin (3R,3´S-zeaxanthin)

Molecular formulas